Deliver Us From Evil is a 1976 American film directed by Horace Jackson.

References

External links

1977 films
1977 drama films
American drama films
Dimension Pictures films
1970s English-language films
1970s American films